Sleeping Giant or The Sleeping Giant may refer to:

Geology 
 Elk Mountain (Routt County, Colorado), known locally as The Sleeping Giant), a mountain near Steamboat Springs, Colorado, USA
 Sleeping Giant (Connecticut), a traprock mountain ridge in Hamden, Connecticut, USA
 Sleeping Giant (Kauai), a mountain ridge on the island of Kauai near Kapaa, Hawaii, USA
 Sleeping Giant mountain and ridge in Montana in the USA, part of  Sleeping Giant Wilderness Study Area
 Sleeping Giant (Ontario), a formation of mesas on Sibley Peninsula, Ontario, Canada
 The Sleeping Giant (Abercraf), local name for hill called Cribarth, Powys, Wales
 The Sleeping Giant, a hill near the village of Kinloch Rannoch in Perth and Kinross, Scotland
 The Sleeping Giant, a rock formation in the Nausori Highlands, Fiji

Titled works 
 Sleeping Giant (film) (2015), a Canadian film
 The Sleeping Giant (album), by rapper Sunny Boy
 "The Sleeping Giant", an episode of the animated television series The Care Bears
 "Sleeping Giant", a song by Mastodon from the album Blood Mountain
 "Sleeping Giant", a song by Flobots from the album Noenemies
 "Sleeping Giant", a song by Dream Theater from the album A View from the Top of the World
 Sleeping Giant, a mixtape by Tajai
 Sleeping Giants, the debut novel of Sylvain Neuvel about the discovery and development of alien artifacts and technology on Earth
 Sleeping Giants, an album by the American hard rock band Heaven Below
 Sleeping Giants, an album by the American musician David Ellefson
 "Sleeping Giant," a 1948 children's story about the Connecticut mountain, by Eleanor Estes

Other uses 
 Sleeping Giant (band), American Christian metal band
 Isoroku Yamamoto's sleeping giant quote regarding the attack on Pearl Harbor
 Sleeping Giants, an internet activism initiative